Calamotropha melli is a moth in the family Crambidae. It was described by Aristide Caradja and Edward Meyrick in 1933. It is found in China  in what was called Guandong, now in Northeast China.

References

Crambinae
Moths described in 1933
Moths of Asia